Sawyer Island is an island  long lying north of Pickwick Island, Pitt Islands, in the Biscoe Islands. Shown on an Argentine government chart of 1957. Named by the United Kingdom Antarctic Place-Names Committee (UK-APC) in 1959 after Robert Sawyer, one of the central characters in Charles Dickens' Pickwick Papers.

See also 
 List of Antarctic and sub-Antarctic islands

()

Islands of the Biscoe Islands